Antonín Hönig was a Czech cyclist. In 1926, he was the Czechoslovak national champion, and he took part in the 1926 UCI Road World Championships. Two years later, he competed for Czechoslovakia in the individual and team road race events at the 1928 Summer Olympics.

Honig's cycling activities were the inspiration for his cousin Josef Josten to take up sports journalism.

References

External links
 
 

Year of birth missing
Year of death missing
Czech male cyclists
Olympic cyclists of Czechoslovakia
Cyclists at the 1928 Summer Olympics
Place of birth missing